Guy Delorme (23 May 1929 – 26 December 2005) was a French actor. He appeared in more than seventy films from 1951 to 1984.

Filmography

References

External links 

1929 births
2005 deaths
French male film actors